Cover Story is a 2000 Indian Malayalam-language action thriller film directed by G. S. Vijayan, written by B. Unnikrishnan and produced by Menaka under the production banner Revathy Kalamandhir. Starring Suresh Gopi and Tabu. The film was edited by A. Sreekar Prasad and had soundtrack composed by Sharreth.

Plot
Jasmine Khan is a computer engineer, who wears contact lens due to vision problems. She meets her next-door neighbour Chandrashekar, a retired judge with a haunted past. The two become friends. Jasmine meets Vijay, a news reporter and the executive director of True Vision who is on a mission to eliminate corruption through Media Channel. During Christmas, Chandrashekar is killed by a mysterious man, who is seen but not recognized by Jasmine, as she was not wearing contact lenses at that time.

ACP Anand suspects Jasmine as retired DGP R.V. Thampuran was killed in her presence in a shopping mall, but is unable to prove due to Vijay's (Anand's college senior and close friend) interference and lack of evidence. The investigation for the true killer begins where Anand concludes that Vijay is actually the killer. What is Vijay's true motives behind the killings forms the rest of the plot.

Cast
 Suresh Gopi as Vijay
 Tabu as Jasmine Khan
 Biju Menon as ACP Anand.S.Nair IPS
 Nedumudi Venu as Retd. Judge Chandrashekara Menon
 Siddique as Politician Isaac Thomas, Main Antagonist
 Augustine as Police Officer Sivaraman
 T. P. Madhavan as Retired Head Constable Chandran Nair
 Rizabawa as Retired DGP R.V Thampuran
 N. F. Varghese as Madhavan, Father of Vijay
 Anu Anand as True Vision Reporter Freddy 
 P. Sreekumar as Businessman Sachidanandan, Secondary Antagonist
 Meghanathan as Police Officer John Varghese
 Shalu Menon as True Vision Reporter
 Ponnamma Babu as Advocate
 Yamuna as Mother of Vijay
 Joemon Joshy as Appu, Grandson of Chandrashekara Menon

Soundtrack 
The film's soundtrack contains 4 songs, all composed by Sharreth. with lyrics by Gireesh Puthenchery.

References

External links
 

2000 films
2000s Malayalam-language films
2000 action thriller films
Films directed by G. S. Vijayan
Indian action thriller films
Films scored by Sharreth